My Fan Ramu is a 2013 Malayalam film directed by debutant Nikhil K. Menon, starring Saiju Kurup and Rajeev Pillai in the lead roles. Actor Saiju Kurup has also written the script for the film, produced by Sasi Ayyanchira.

Plot
Ramu, who is an ardent film buff, is nurturing exalted hopes of making it big as an actor someday. He is a diehard fan of young macho superstar Abhiram, the heartthrob of youngsters. Ramu's father runs a wayside ramshackle tea stall. Ramu looks down upon the lifestyle that has been bequeathed on him by his father. His cinematic ambitions which was going nowhere, suddenly receive a shot in the arm as he manages to emerge winner in a reality show, which offers the winner a chance to spend ten days with superstar Abhiram. Ramu accompanied by his sidekick and a naive moneylender, who is reluctant to let Ramu scot- free before his debt is settled, arrives at the superstar's home. The Superstar finds himself at his wits end, unable to tolerate the cumbersome threesome, who plays havoc with his privacy.

Cast
 Saiju Kurup as Ramachandran aka Ramu
 Rajeev Pillai as Abhiram
 Bijukuttan as Kuttan
 Guinness Pakru as Banker Pappan
 Spadikam George as Swami
 Malavika Wales as Shalini
 Sudheer Karamana as ACP Umesh Shetty IPS
 Vivek Gopan as Siddik
 Kundara Johny as Commissioner
 Abi as Amrithraj
 Bheeman Raghu as Golden Roy
 V.K Baiju as CI Reghu
 Saiby Kidangoor as CI Iqbal
 P. Balachandran as Ramachandran
 Kalabhavan Prajod
 Bineesh Kodiyeri as Lankesh
 Joju George as Sanju
 Sajan Palluruthy
 Nishitha as Tanuja
 Durga as TV Anchor
 Samskruthy Shenoy as Channel representative
 Naveen Arakkal
(Special appearance)
 Nivin Pauly
 Munna Simon
 Nikhil Nair
 Nishanth Sagar
 Rejith Menon

References

External links 
review
review
review
2010s Malayalam-language films
2013 films